Ratha’s Courage is a novel by Clare Bell. It was published in 2008 by Imaginator Press.

This novel is the final one in the Ratha series, also re-titled as The Books of the Named.

In Ratha's Courage, the fifth book in the Named series, Ratha extends the use of the Red Tongue to a hunter tribe. One of the hunters ignites a blaze that sets off a devastating conflict between the two clans. Now Ratha must find the courage within herself to set it right.

Plot summary
The Named and the hunter Tribe have entered into an uneasy alliance as neighbors. When Quiet Hunter, a young member of the Tribe, asks the Named if they can share their fire to warm the Tribe's cubs, a strange young male steals the Red Tongue in an attempt to harness its powers. However, he is young and foolish, and he accidentally starts a canyon fire which kills many of his tribe, mainly the Tribe's breeding-age females.

When the mating season comes the leader of the Tribe, True-of-voice, ends up driving out the younger males from his tribe because they are competition for females. New-Singer (True-of-Voice's son) leads the outcast young males with his song, and wages an attack on the Named. New-Singer's Tribe kills the majority of the cubs and kidnaps the Named females, with the exception of Ratha. Ratha attempts to rescue her clan sisters by sneaking into the new Tribe's camp, but ends up in captivity herself. New-Singer waits until all the females are in heat, and then begins a courting circle. During this frenzy, it is revealed that the strange young male who stole the fire was Night-who-eats-Stars, Ratha's long lost son. 

Two young Named cubs, Mishanti and Bundi, end up helping the Named males in destroying the courting circle with their "Rumblers" (Paraceratherium), and the young Tribe members are driven away.

References

2008 American novels
American fantasy novels
Young adult fantasy novels
American young adult novels
Children's novels about animals
Novels set in prehistory